Banail Union is a union of Mirzapur Upazila, Tangail District, Bangladesh. It is situated  19 km west of Mirzapur and 38 km southeast of Tangail, the district headquarters.

Demographics
According to Population Census 2011 performed by Bangladesh Bureau of Statistics, The total population of Banail union is 23408. There are  5291 households in total.

Education
The literacy rate of Banail Union is 58.3% (Male-61.6%, Female-55.4%).

See also
 Union Councils of Tangail District

References

Populated places in Tangail District
Unions of Mirzapur Upazila